Legally Blonde 2: Red, White & Blonde (also referred to simply as Legally Blonde 2) is a 2003 American comedy film directed by Charles Herman-Wurmfeld and written by Kate Kondell. It is a sequel to the 2001 film Legally Blonde and the second film in the Legally Blonde series. It stars Reese Witherspoon (who also served as the film's executive producer) alongside an ensemble cast featuring Sally Field, Regina King, Jennifer Coolidge, Bruce McGill, Dana Ivey, Mary Lynn Rajskub, Bob Newhart, Luke Wilson, and Bruce Thomas, with Coolidge, Wilson, and Thomas reprising their roles from the first film.

Although the story is set in Washington, D.C., the film was shot in the offices at Vivint Arena (then the Delta Center), the Utah State Capitol in Salt Lake City, Utah, and the Illinois State Capitol in Springfield, Illinois. The supposed "aerial views" on Washington buildings were scale models built by the crew.

The film opened on July 2, 2003, to generally negative reviews from critics. Nevertheless, it was a box office success, grossing $125 million worldwide. It was followed by a 2003 television pilot, starring Jennifer Hall, and a 2009 spin-off, Legally Blondes, starring Camilla and Rebecca Rosso, while a sequel is in development, with Witherspoon, Coolidge, Wilson, and Thomas reprising their roles.

Plot

After graduating from Harvard Law School, Elle Woods wants her Chihuahua, Bruiser, to reunite with his mother, hoping both dogs will attend her wedding to her fiancé Emmett. Elle hires a detective to find Bruiser's mother, only to discover that her owner is C'est Magnifique, a cosmetics company that uses Bruiser's mother for testing. Discovering her law firm represents the corporation, she urges the firm to drop them as a client, but is dismissed.

Elle decides to leave Boston for Washington, D.C., to work on Bruiser's Bill. Elle takes it upon herself to be the "voice for those who can't speak" and to outlaw animal testing. While working for Congresswoman Victoria Rudd, Elle is met with skepticism and other barriers common to Washington politics. Rudd's member of staff, Timothy, sarcastically calls her "Capitol Barbie". After a variety of ups and downs including a failed attempt to improve her work environment by having her co-workers write compliments about one another and place them in the "snap cup", Elle starts to lose her faith in Washington politics.

Elle discovers that Bruiser is gay, after she is paged by "The Paws That Refreshes: A Doggy Day Spa". He has been affectionate with Leslie, a Rottweiller owned by Congressman Stan Marks, the Chairman of the Committee on Energy and Commerce which has jurisdiction over Bruiser's Bill. Elle also finds that Congresswoman Libby Hauser, the Ranking Member of the same committee, was a member of Elle's sorority Delta Nu. As a result, both Marks and Hauser warm to Elle and eventually come to support Bruiser's Bill.

Elle also discovers that Congresswoman Rudd has actually been working against her. She has been trying to satisfy the interests of a major campaign donor named "Bob" (whom Rudd has several telephone conversations).

However, Rudd is eventually blackmailed into supporting Elle's petition thanks to her Chief of Staff, Grace Rossiter. She has a recorded conversation during which Rudd admits to Elle that she has been working against Bruiser's Bill in order to help her sponsors who want to continue testing on animals.

As Grace is appalled that Rudd lied to Elle and blamed it on her, Grace and Elle eventually reach a place of mutual respect, especially after Grace admits she came to Washington D.C. with an enthusiasm not unlike Elle's, but later lost that idealism when she discovered how dirty politics could really be.

With the help of her friends, Elle's discharge petition is successful, and Bruiser's Bill is brought to the floor of the House. Bruiser's mother and the rest of the dogs are released by C'est Magnifique Corporation.

Elle and Emmett get married in a park in D.C., albeit not at Fenway Park as they had planned, but standing on the home plate which has been delivered to D.C. by Paulette's husband. Emmett asks Elle where she wants to live since they are now a married couple, and he goes on to suggest the cities of Boston, New York City, and Washington DC. Elle glances at the White House, winking at the camera as the movie ends.

Cast
 Reese Witherspoon as Elle Woods
 Moonie as Bruiser Woods
 Sally Field as Victoria Rudd
 Regina King as Grace Rossiter
 Jennifer Coolidge as Paulette Bonafonté
 Luke Wilson as Emmett Richmond
 Bob Newhart as Sid Post
 Bruce McGill as Stan Marks
 Dana Ivey as Libby Hauser
 Jessica Cauffiel as Margot Chapman
 Alanna Ubach as Serena McGuire
 Gidget as Bruiser's Mom
 Bruce Thomas as UPS Guy
 Mary Lynn Rajskub as Reena Giuliani
 J. Barton as Timothy McGinn 
 Sam Pancake as Kevin
 Jennifer Tisdale as Tiffany Donohugh
 Octavia Spencer as Security Guard
 Sarah Shahi (uncredited) as Becky
 Masi Oka (uncredited) as Congressional Intern

Sequel

In June 2018, Reese Witherspoon entered negotiations with Metro-Goldwyn-Mayer to produce and star in a third installment in the Legally Blonde film series. Karen McCullah Lutz and Kirsten Smith were hired as co-screenwriters. MGM later confirmed in a Twitter post that Legally Blonde 3 was set to be released on May 8, 2020, though it did not meet this date. In May 2020, it was announced that Mindy Kaling and Dan Goor would write an entirely new script for the film.

Reception

Critical response 
On review aggregator Rotten Tomatoes, the film has an approval rating of 36% based on 159 reviews, with an average rating 4.9/10. The site's critical consensus states: "This blonde joke is less funny the second time around." On Metacritic, it has a weighted average score of 47 based on 39 critics, indicating "mixed or average reviews". Audiences surveyed by CinemaScore gave the film a grade of "B" on scale of A+ to F. Entertainment Weekly ranked it at number 21 on their list of "Top 25 Worst Sequels Ever Made" (2006).

Box office

Legally Blonde 2: Red, White & Blonde hit theaters on the Wednesday before the Fourth of July in 2003 and grossed nearly $40 million by Monday. The following weekend ticket sales were half of that and the film quickly left theaters in the coming weeks. Grossing about $90 million in the U.S., the film was a success for the studio, though many expected it to perform just as well as Witherspoon's last big film, Sweet Home Alabama.

Soundtrack

A soundtrack for the film was released on July 1, 2003, by Curb Records. "We Can" was released as a single for the soundtrack by American country music recording artist LeAnn Rimes on October 28, 2003, by Curb Records.

 Track listing

Notes

References

External links

 
 
 
 

2000s American films
2000s English-language films
2000s legal films
2003 comedy films
2003 films
20th Century Fox films
American comedy films
American legal films
American sequel films
Blond hair
Fiction about government
Films about animal rights
Films about dogs
Films about fraternities and sororities
Films about lawyers
Films directed by Charles Herman-Wurmfeld
Films produced by Marc E. Platt
Films produced by Reese Witherspoon
Films scored by Rolfe Kent
Films set in Washington, D.C.
Films shot in Illinois
Films shot in Los Angeles
Films shot in Massachusetts
Films shot in Salt Lake City
Legal comedy films
Legally Blonde (franchise)
Metro-Goldwyn-Mayer films